Lars Petrus Folke von Celsing (1 April 1916 – 17 August 2009) was a Swedish diplomat.

Career
von Celsing was born in Stockholm, Sweden, the son of Folke von Celsing, a bank executive, and his wife Margareta (née Norström) and brother of the architect Peter Celsing and the doctor Fredrik Celsing. He passed studentexamen on 8 May 1934 and received a Candidate of Law degree from Stockholm University College on 27 May 1942. von Celsing did university studies in Paris and Berlin before becoming an attaché at the Ministry for Foreign Affairs in 1942. He served in Bern in 1943 and was second legation secretary in Bern in 1947 and served in the UN delegation the same year. In 1948 he moved to New York City and served at the United Nations Security Council.

He became first legation secretary in London in 1950 and first secretary at the Foreign Ministry in 1952. von Celsing was acting chargé d'affaires in Lisbon from 1953 to 1954 and in 1955 he became first embassy secretary in Tehran and Baghdad. He was embassy counsellor in Helsinki from 1958 to 1962 and director of the political department at the Foreign Ministry in 1963 and became deputy director in 1965. von Celsing was ambassador in Rabat, Nouakchott, Dakar and Banjul from 1967 to 1972, Cairo and Khartoum from 1972 to 1976 and in Brussels and Luxembourg City from 1976 to 1979.

Personal life
von Celsing was married Silvia Elena Maria (Sylvita) Miguens (born 1919) on 4 July 1942 in Stockholm. She was the daughter of the ambassador Carlos Miguens and Silvia de Cásares. They divorced in 1950 and in 1955 von Celsing married the actress Ulla Zetterberg (1923–2011), the daughter of merchant Erik Börjesson and Ida (née Clauss). von Celsing was the father of Christina (born 1944) and Helena (born 1947). von Celsing died on 17 August 2009 and was buried in Lovö cemetery in Lovön in Ekerö Municipality, Sweden.

Awards and decorations
Commander of the Order of Homayoun
Knight, 1st Class of the Order of St. Olav

Bibliography

References

1916 births
2009 deaths
Ambassadors of Sweden to Morocco
Ambassadors of Sweden to the Gambia
Ambassadors of Sweden to Senegal
Ambassadors of Sweden to Mauritania
Ambassadors of Sweden to Egypt
Ambassadors of Sweden to Sudan
Ambassadors of Sweden to Belgium
Ambassadors of Sweden to Luxembourg
People from Stockholm
Stockholm University alumni